Ivan Ibriks (born 6 October 1987) is a Croatian football defender, currently playing for lower league side Podravac Sopje.

External links
 
Ivan Ibriks at Sportnet.hr 

1987 births
Living people
Sportspeople from Virovitica
Association football midfielders
Association football fullbacks
Croatian footballers
HNK Suhopolje players
NK Osijek players
RNK Split players
NK Vinogradar players
Croatian Football League players